David Wilstein (March 8, 1928 – July 9, 2017) was an American real estate developer and philanthropist. He was the founder of Realtech Construction Co. He developed over 100 buildings in Los Angeles as well as in Japan, Thailand, Turkey and China. Wilstein supported charitable causes in Los Angeles and Israel.

Early life
David Wilstein was born on March 8, 1928, in Pittsburgh, Pennsylvania. He had a brother, Leonard. He graduated from the University of Pittsburgh, where he earned a bachelor's degree in engineering.

Career
Wilstein began his career by designing freeways in the 1950s.

In 1976, Wilstein founded Realtech Construction Co., a real estate development company, with his brother Leonard. He first developed a building for an investor from Cuba, with the promise of a "6% or 7% return." He later developed the 12-story Roar Building on the corner of Wilshire Boulevard and Roxbury Drive in Beverly Hills the Los Feliz Towers, and the 25-story Wells Fargo Center on the corner of Wilshire Boulevard and San Vicente Boulevard in Brentwood. Additionally, he designed the Century City Medical Plaza, whose penthouse his office was based in. He also developed buildings in Japan, Thailand, Turkey and China.

Over the course of his career, Wilstein developed over 100 buildings.

Philanthropy
Wilstein made charitable contributions to causes in Los Angeles and Israel. He served on the boards of directors of the California State University, the Cedars-Sinai Medical Center, the Brandeis-Bardin Institute and the American Friends of the Hebrew University of Jerusalem.

Personal life and death
Wilstein married his wife, Susan, in the 1950s. They had a daughter, Denise Margolin. He resided in Beverly Hills, California, and he was Jewish.

Wilstein died on July 9, 2017, at the age of 89. He was buried at the Hillside Memorial Park Cemetery on July 13, 2017.

References

1928 births
2017 deaths
People from Pittsburgh
People from Beverly Hills, California
University of Pittsburgh alumni
American real estate businesspeople
Philanthropists from California
Jewish American philanthropists
20th-century American philanthropists
21st-century American Jews